Ri Hyok-chol is a North Korean former footballer. He represented North Korea on at least five occasions between 2004 and 2007, scoring three goals.

Career statistics

International

International goals
Scores and results list North Korea's goal tally first, score column indicates score after each North Korea goal.

References

1985 births
Living people
North Korean footballers
North Korea international footballers
Association football forwards